312 RiverRun is a Chicago public hiking area under construction along the Chicago River.
The development is a further move toward Chicago's goal of having a continuous pedestrian path along the entire riverfront. It will connect three parks with one bike and pedestrian path, and will extend nearly two miles. The park project receives funding from organizations including the Federal Highway Administration, the Illinois Department of Transportation, and the Chicago Metropolitan Agency for Planning. The first phase of the project connects Richard Clark Park to California Park via the Riverview Bridge, crossing from the east bank to the west bank of the Chicago River creating an continuous path between Belmont Avenue and Irving Park Road. The Riverview Bridge opened in late November 2019. The project is expected to be completed by Fall 2020 after the Irving Park Road bridge replacement is completed. Upon completion of 312 RiverRun, there will exist a continuous trail to Montrose Avenue via Horner park.

References

External links
Chicago Park District

2019 establishments in Illinois
Bike paths in the Chicago metropolitan area
Elevated parks
Parks in Chicago